The Medal for Long Marital Life is a Polish medal established on February 17, 1960. It is awarded to couples who have been married for at least 50 years. 
It is a round, silver medal with six (6) rays. The obverse has a pink enameled center with two roses with intertwined stems superimposed. The reverse has the letters RP in the center. Surrounding this are the words: ZA DŁUGOLETNIE POŻYCIE MAŁŻEŃSKIE in a circle. The medal is 35mm in diameter. The ribbon is 37mm wide with a 4mm wide white stripe in the center of the ribbon.

Orders, decorations, and medals of Poland
Awards established in 1960
Marriage
1960 establishments in Poland